Kosmos 1375 ( meaning Cosmos 1375) was a target satellite which was used by the Soviet Union in the 1980s for tests of anti-satellite weapons as part of the "anti-satellite weapon" Istrebitel Sputnikov program. It was a product of the Dnepropetrovsk Sputnik satellite development program. 

It was launched at 17:10 UTC on 6 June 1982, using a Kosmos-3M carrier rocket, flying from Site 132/2 at the Plesetsk Cosmodrome in Northwest Russia. This was the final launch of a Dnepropetrovsk Sputnik program satellite, a program that dated back to the early 1960's.

On 18 June 1982, it was successfully intercepted and destroyed by Kosmos 1379 in the final Soviet anti-satellite weapons test to be conducted. As of 2022, debris is still in orbit.

Kosmos 1375 was the last of ten Lira satellites to be launched, of which all but the first were successful. Lira was derived from the earlier DS-P1-M satellite, which it replaced.

See also

1982 in spaceflight

References

Spacecraft launched in 1982
Intentionally destroyed artificial satellites
1982 in the Soviet Union
Kosmos satellites
Dnepropetrovsk Sputnik program
Spacecraft that broke apart in space